Kim Weber (21 October 1945 – 25 June 2022) was a Finnish sailor. He competed in the Finn event at the 1972 Summer Olympics.

References

External links
 

1945 births
2022 deaths
Finnish male sailors (sport)
Olympic sailors of Finland
Sailors at the 1972 Summer Olympics – Finn
Sportspeople from Helsinki